Wardleworth railway station served the township of Wardleworth in Rochdale, in the Metropolitan Borough of Rochdale in Greater Manchester, England, from 1870 until closure in 1947. It was on the Facit Branch between Rochdale and Facit, which was extended to Bacup in 1881. The station was quite well placed for Rochdale town centre and so, in addition to the branch trains, a few other services from  Manchester terminated here. Between here and Rochdale station was the Roch Valley Viaduct, now demolished.

References

Lost Railways of Lancashire by Gordon Suggitt

Disused railway stations in the Metropolitan Borough of Rochdale
Former Lancashire and Yorkshire Railway stations
Railway stations in Great Britain opened in 1870
Railway stations in Great Britain closed in 1947